Vishwa Adluri specializes in Indian philosophy. He is a strong critic of the academic discipline of Indology.

Education 
Adluri enrolled for a PhD under the supervision of Michael Hahn, Professor of Indology and Tibetology at the University of Marburg but was failed. He responded by accusing Hahn's (and others') scholarship of having Nazi trends, notwithstanding the fact that Hahn had a Jewish heritage.

The university responded by reconstituting the committee — without any German Indologists — and Adluri was conferred a PhD. Hahn criticized this reconstitution as submitting to ploy of eliminating potential dissenters.

Scholarship 
Adluri has been a fervent critic of, what he calls, "German Indology". He accuses the development of the thought-school to be intrinsically tied with Nazism and asserts that "German Indologists" continue to service the Nazi causes. In 2016, he co-authored The Nay Science: A History of German Indology, which was published by Oxford University Press.

Reception 
Hans Harder, Angelika Malinar and Thomas Oberlies, in a 2011 editorial for Zeitschrift für Indologie und Südasienstudien on combating "discrimination, racism and sexism", noted that Adluri's works engaged in polemics against multiple German scholars under the veneer of probing ideological orientations of scholarship. Jürgen Hanneder mounted a detailed critique of Adluri's scholarship, the same year. The Nay Science was subject to scathing critiques by Eli Franco, Jürgen Hanneder, and Bharani Kollipara. However, Garry W. Trompf praised it as an "extraordinary work"; so did Eric Kurlander and Nicholas A. Germana.

Notes

References 

Living people
Hunter College faculty
University of Marburg alumni
Year of birth missing (living people)